This list is of the Cultural Properties of Japan designated in the category of  for the Prefecture of Iwate.

National Cultural Properties
As of 1 July 2019, one National Treasure has been designated.

Prefectural Cultural Properties
As of 2019, nine properties have been designated at a prefectural level.

See also
 Cultural Properties of Japan
 List of National Treasures of Japan (paintings)
 Japanese painting
 List of Historic Sites of Japan (Iwate)
 Iwate Museum of Art

References

External links
  Cultural Properties in Iwate Prefecture

Cultural Properties,Iwate
Cultural Properties,Paintings
Paintings,Iwate
Lists of paintings